Ted Strawns (2 December 1876 – 19 September 1958) was an Australian rules footballer for .

References

Australian rules footballers from South Australia
1876 births
1958 deaths
Port Adelaide Football Club (SANFL) players
Port Adelaide Football Club players (all competitions)